Fergus Greene (born 20 December 1997) is a professional Australian rules footballer who plays for the Hawthorn Football Club in the Australian Football League (AFL). He made his debut in round 19 of the 2018 AFL season against  at Eureka Stadium.

Career 
Greene played junior football for Sandhurst and Catholic College Bendigo. In 2015, he suffered a navicular bone injury, but returned in 2016 and played well in the first half of the season. He was recruited by the Bendigo Pioneers and played five TAC Cup games in 2016. He recorded a 15.6 beep test at the Rookie Me Combine, the best time recorded nationally before the 2016 AFL draft. He was selected by the Western Bulldogs with their fourth selection, pick 70, in the 2016 national draft. 

In 2017, he kicked three goals on his Victorian Football League (VFL) debut in round 4 and followed up with five goals against Werribee the next week. However, he was restricted to eight VFL games for the year by a broken wrist – which kept him out for eight weeks – and cracked ribs later in the season. In 2018, he played in the inaugural AFLX pre-season competition and showed strong form in his first nine VFL matches. Coach Steve Grace was "super pleased" with Greene and praised his maturity and mental improvement. He played 14 VFL matches and kicked 18 goals before his round 19 AFL debut. On debut, Greene kicked a goal from a  set shot in the second quarter, laid five tackles and amassed five disposals.

Greene had been compared to fellow Bulldogs forward Tory Dickson – the two were both late developers and have reliable set shot routines, innate 'goal sense' and forward pressure.

Greene was delisted at the conclusion of the 2020 AFL season after playing just 5 games, all in the 2018 AFL season.

Greene played for the Box Hill Hawks Football Club in the Victorian Football League in 2021 and 2022.  Greene kicked 30 goals in 2021 and 53 goals in 2022. He kicked 83 goals from 26 games. 

Greene was signed by Hawthorn as a delisted free agent at the end of the 2022 season.

Statistics 
Updated as of end of 2020.

|-
| 2017 ||  || 30
| 0 || — || — || — || — || — || — || — || — || — || — || — || — || — || — || 0
|-
| 2018 ||  || 30
| 5 || 5 || 6 || 27 || 17 || 44 || 18 || 15 || 1.0 || 1.2 || 5.4 || 3.4 || 8.8 || 3.6 || 3.0 || 0
|-
| 2019 ||  || 30
| 0 || — || — || — || — || — || — || — || — || — || — || — || — || — || — || 0
|-
| 2020 ||  || 30
| 0 || — || — || — || — || — || — || — || — || — || — || — || — || — || — || 0
|- class=sortbottom
! colspan=3 | Career
! 5 !! 5 !! 6 !! 27 !! 17 !! 44 !! 18 !! 15 !! 1.0 !! 1.2 !! 5.4 !! 3.4 !! 8.8 !! 3.6 !! 3.0 || 0
|}

Notes

Personal life 
Greene is the son of Chris Greene and Anne Hartney  and the nephew of former  player Brendan Hartney.

References

External links 

Living people
1997 births
Sandhurst Football Club players
Western Bulldogs players
Bendigo Pioneers players
Box Hill Football Club players
Australian rules footballers from Victoria (Australia)
Hawthorn Football Club players